Vachellia aroma var. huarango is low shrub or small tree which grows less than 1.5 m tall, but up to 5 m across.  It is found in Ecuador and Peru. This species should not be confused with the Huarango tree Prosopis pallida which is also native to Peru.

References

aroma var. huarango